John Jinks (4 May 1871 – 11 September 1934) (often known as Alderman Jinks from his position as an Alderman on Sligo Corporation) was an Irish politician who served in Dáil Éireann from June to August 1927.

Biography 
He was born as John Jenk, to Patrick Jenk (also Jinks), a farmer, and Bridget Gilmartin, of Drumcliff, County Sligo.

An auctioneer and licensed grocer, he was elected to Dáil Éireann as Teachta Dála (TD) for the 7-seat Leitrim–Sligo constituency at the June 1927 general election for the National League Party.

He is most famous for his absence, on 16 August 1927, from a crucial vote. The Labour Party had proposed a motion of no confidence in the Cumann na nGaedheal Executive Council. They proposed an alternative coalition government with the National League, supported by Fianna Fáil, which had just entered the Dáil. Jinks's abstention resulted in a tied vote (71–71) and the government survived on the casting vote of the Ceann Comhairle. His absence had been unannounced and unauthorised by the party. He afterwards explained that he had been opposed to the proposed alliance between the National League, Labour and Fianna Fáil, but did not want to create a split by voting against the party or by announcing his decision in advance. He described the "sensational rumour" of a kidnapping as "sheer invention". Many colourful stories have grown up over the years as to the means by which his absence from the voting lobbies was secured.

Jinks resigned from the National League on 18 August, stating that he could not "remain any longer a member of a party from which my political outlook so distinctly differs". After Cumann na nGaedheal won two by-elections held on 24 August, a new general election was called. In the September 1927 general election, he stood as an Independent candidate, but was not re-elected.

In 1928 and 1934, he was elected to Sligo County Council as a Cumann na nGaedheal and Fine Gael candidate respectively.

References

1871 births
1934 deaths
National League Party TDs
Members of the 5th Dáil
Politicians from County Sligo
Local councillors in County Sligo
Independent politicians in Ireland
Cumann na nGaedheal politicians
Fine Gael politicians